Jerry Vandam (born 8 December 1988) is a French professional footballer who plays as a right back for Régional 1 club Grande-Synthe.

Club career

Lille
Vandam signed for Lille in 2003, playing for youth teams until 2007. He began his professional career at the club, making his Ligue 1 debut in a 3–1 win over Rennes on 16 February 2008, where he came on as a substitute in the 81st minute for Nicolas Plestan.

Loan to Caen 
Vandam agreed to join Caen on loan from Lille for 2011–12 Ligue 1 season. He made 36 appearances out of Caen's 38 league matches, scoring one goal. Vandam made his debut for Caen in a 1–0 win over Valenciennes on 6 August 2011, at the Stade Michel d'Ornano. He scored his first goal for the club in the 82nd minute following an assist by Frédéric Bulot in a 4–2 loss to Paris Saint-Germain on 29 October 2011, at the Parc des Princes. Caen were eventually relegated in 18th position, three points shy from safety in Ligue 1.

Mechelen
On 27 January 2013, Vandam joined Belgian Pro League club Mechelen on a 3-year contract until 30 June 2016.

International career
Vandam was born in Lille, France, to Ghanaian parents. In September 2010, he expressed his desire to play for Ghana.

Career statistics

References

1988 births
Living people
French footballers
Footballers from Lille
French sportspeople of Ghanaian descent
Ligue 1 players
Lille OSC players
Stade Malherbe Caen players
K.V. Mechelen players
S.K. Beveren players
Belgian Pro League players
Association football fullbacks
S.S. Ischia Isolaverde players
USL Dunkerque players
Le Puy Foot 43 Auvergne players
Serie C players
Championnat National players
Championnat National 2 players
Régional 1 players
French expatriate footballers
French expatriate sportspeople in Belgium
Expatriate footballers in Belgium
French expatriate sportspeople in Italy
Expatriate footballers in Italy
Black French sportspeople